"Tiger" Tom Pistone (born March 17, 1929 in Chicago, Illinois, USA) is a former NASCAR Grand National driver from Chicago. He made his Grand National debut in 1955. He won two races and finished 6th in championship points in the 1959 season for Carl Rupert, his best season statistically. He was away from NASCAR in 1963 and 1964, but returned in 1965 to drive in 33 races for Glen Sweet and Emory Gilliam, a career high, but only 8 top tens and a 32nd-place points finish came of it. His final and 130th cup race came in 1968. He won two NASCAR Convertible Division races.

In 1960, he wore a life preserver and an oxygen tube in his car while racing at Daytona for fear of running into the lake in the middle of the speedway and drowning. This happened after Tommy Irwin ran into the lake in the first qualifying race. Irwin did not drown, however.

On October 17, 2010, Pistone was one of the year's 15 inductees to the Racers' Reunion Hall of Fame, located at Memory Lane Museum in Mooresville NC.

Still active in racing at age 81, Pistone has a thriving race car parts business in Charlotte, NC, and can often be found mentoring young drivers at Charlotte Motor Speedway.  He prepares and crews for several Legends and Bandolero drivers in the Winter Heat and Summer Shootout series. His grandson, Chase Pistone, races in the Camping World Truck Series.

In April 2011, Pistone appeared on an episode of The History Channel's American Pickers in which he sold items to be placed in the NASCAR Hall of Fame.

References

External links

 

1929 births
NASCAR drivers
Living people
Racing drivers from Chicago
American people of Italian descent